Gnashing of Teeth, originally Enslaved, was an American technical metal band that originated in Dayton, Ohio in 1999. The band has played with bands such as Abated Mass of Flesh, Every Knee Shall Bow, Extol, A Plea for Purging, Wolves at the Gate and Corpus Christi. The band played Cornerstone Festival in 2011.

History
The band started in 1993 with Original members Duane White (guitars/vocals) and Larry Davis (drums) under the name Enslaved. At their inception, they played a style resembling progressive metal. In 1995, they put the band on a brief hiatus. They later reconvened in 1998 and got signed to Rowe Productions. They released their debut self-titled album under Rowe. In 2001, the band recorded a cover of Living Sacrifice's song "No Longer", off of the Reborn, for the Tribute to Living Sacrifice compilation, which consisted of many bands such as Soul Embraced, Kekal and Crutch. In 2003, they released an independent EP titled Nom. After several years of silence, the band reformed in 2010 and released an album titled Walking the Appain Way on Sacrosanct Records. In 2011, the band played Cornerstone Festival. In 2014, Bassist Kyle Rockwell announced his departure from the band. In May 2016, the band announced that they were disbanding after over 20 years. On June 16, 2019, the band announced they were reuniting with the lineup of Chris McKinney, Duane White, Larry Davis, Kyle Rockwell, and Travis Cooper and would be performing at Audiofeed Festival. On September 6, 2019, the band released a new single, titled “Judas Goat”, independently.

Members
Current Lineup
 Chris McKinney - vocals
 Duane White - guitar, backing vocals (1993-2016, 2019-present)
 Travis Cooper - guitar
 Kyle Rockwell - bass (2007-2009, 2011-2014, 2019-present)
 Larry Davis - drums (1993-2016, 2019-present)

Former
 Ryan Duke - vocals
 Ryan Lynd - guitar 
 Marc Garman - bass
 Nate Landis - bass
 Josh Deeter - bass (2014-2016)
 Matt Anderson - bass 
 Ian Hilt - guitar
 Mike Wise - vocals
 Jay Myers - guitar

Discography
Studio albums
 Gnashing of Teeth (2000)
 Walking the Appain Way (2010)
 Death of Beauty (2012; unreleased)
EPs
 Nom (2005)

Singles
”Judas Goat” (2019)

Other songs
 "No Longer" originally performed by Living Sacrifice; released on the A Tribute to Living Sacrifice album (2001)

References

Musical groups established in 1999
Musical groups disestablished in 2016
American Christian metal musical groups
Rowe Productions artists
Musical groups from Dayton, Ohio
1999 establishments in Ohio